The LCDR Tiger class was a class of twenty-four steam  locomotives. They were designed by Thomas Russell Crampton for the London, Chatham and Dover Railway (LCDR) as general purpose passenger locomotives.

During 1859–60 the LCDR board considered the need for new locomotives to operate lines then under construction. After consultation with various engineers, including Charles Patrick Stewart (of Sharp, Stewart and Company), Robert Sinclair (of the Eastern Counties Railway) and Crampton, they decided upon forty new locomotives: eight first class fast locomotives, seventeen general purpose passenger locomotives, and fifteen goods locomotives. After discussion with William Martley, the quantities needed for the two passenger types were revised to 5 and 24 respectively. Tenders were sought, and these were considered in July 1860, when orders were placed with several firms for what were to become the Echo, Tiger and Acis classes.

The Tiger class, comprising 24 general purpose passenger locomotives, were ordered from three firms: Peto, Brassey and Betts were to build ten at £3,280 each; Slaughter, Grüning & Co. were to build six at £3,300 each; and R. & W. Hawthorn & Co. would build eight at £3,415 each. As with the Echo and Acis classes, the locomotives were equipped with the Cudworth coal-burning firebox. They were delivered to the LCDR between August 1861 and August 1862. During 1862–65, the locomotives were rebuilt with the  wheel arrangement.

Like other LCDR locomotives delivered prior to 1874, the locomotives had no numbers at first, being distinguished by name. In November 1875, William Kirtley (who had replaced Martley following the latter's death in 1874) allotted the class letter G. The locomotives were then given the numbers 3–26. Withdrawal began in January 1892, and by the time that the South Eastern and Chatham Railway (SECR) was formed at the start of 1899, nine remained in service. Of these, four were transferred directly to the duplicate list and had their LCDR numbers suffixed with the letter A; four had their numbers increased by 459 to avoid duplication with former South Eastern Railway locomotives; and one was both increased by 459 and suffixed A. The last one was withdrawn in March 1907.

Lethe was renamed Sphynx in August 1862, because the railway staff found the name difficult to pronounce.

Notes

References

Tiger
4-4-0 locomotives
2-4-0 locomotives
Railway locomotives introduced in 1861
Avonside locomotives
Hawthorn locomotives
Scrapped locomotives
Standard gauge steam locomotives of Great Britain